Boven-Digoel was a Dutch concentration camp for political prisoners operated in the Dutch East Indies from 1927 to 1947. It was located in a remote area on the banks of the river Digul, in what is now Boven Digoel Regency in South Papua, Indonesia. The site was chosen in 1928 for the internal exile of Indonesians implicated in the 1926 and 1927 communist uprisings in Java and Sumatra. Indonesian nationalists not associated with the Indonesian Communist Party were subsequently also sent there.

History

The camp was located in an isolated part of New Guinea, and surrounded by hundreds of miles of impenetrable jungle and hostile Papua tribes, so that contact with the outside world, and escape, was next to impossible. It was notorious for its endemic malaria.

The Boven-Digoel detainees had not been tried and sentenced to prison. Instead they were exiled to the camp by the Governor-General using so-called exorbitante rechten which permitted him to exile any resident of the colony. Exile was not a judicial process and was not subject to appeal.

Among those interned here were writer Marco Kartodikromo, Mohammad Hatta, who would become the first vice president of Indonesia, Sutan Sjahrir, the first Indonesian Prime Minister and Soetitah who was chair of the women's section of the Communist party.

Conditions were not good in the camp, especially for those prisoners who refused to work for the Dutch; one former journalist, Lie Eng Hok, wrote a letter to his former paper  in 1929 about worsening conditions, which was translated and reprinted in the Dutch press. In it, he noted that the camp authorities had reduced the prisoners' stipend by one quarter, and that by the following year they would no longer receive any at all, and that the prisoners were becoming so poor that they could no longer afford to spend money on each others' "businesses". On the other hand, the camp doctor L. J. A. Schoonheyt published a book about his experiences there in which he claimed conditions in the camp were ideal and even pleasant; copies of the book made its way back to camp internees who were enraged by his whitewashing. Another issue was that the tree cover had been so thoroughly cleared to make space for the camp that there was no shade from the sun in most the camps.

In the late 1930s, the Dutch continued to use Digoel as a way to threaten dissidents in the Indies; in 1938 the Governor General proposed that twelve more communists be exiled there, mostly members of Tan Malaka's new independent Communist movement Pari but also PKI members who had been in clandestine communication with communists in the Netherlands. These people who were nominated for exile were kept in "pretrial detention" for some time.

In May 1940, the Dutch colonial ministry decided to stop referring to Boven-Digoel as a concentration camp, seeing how the Nazi use of such camps was making it politically unpopular; they sent a memo to all departments to cease using that term.

Most detainees were evacuated to Australia during the Second World War, but the camp was abolished only in 1947.

Popular culture
A number of accounts or novelizations of life in the camp were released while it was still operating.

The Indonesian novelist Pramoedya Ananta Toer, himself a political prisoner during the New Order era, was very interested in Boven-Digoel. He released an 2001 anthology of accounts of the camp titled  (Stories from Digul), and the protagonist of his 1985 novel Footsteps experiences exile to the Eastern parts of the Indies as well. Chalid Salim, a former Digoel prisoner, also published his account in the Netherlands in 1973, titled .

See also
:Category:Boven-Digoel concentration camp detainees
Boven Digoel Regency

References

Further reading

Dutch East Indies
History of New Guinea
Penal system in Indonesia
Internment camps of the Dutch Empire
Internment camps in Indonesia